Point of Rocks is a historic passenger rail station on the MARC Brunswick Line between Washington, D.C., and Martinsburg, WV, located at Point of Rocks, Frederick County, Maryland, United States. The station was built by the Baltimore and Ohio Railroad in 1873, and designed by E. Francis Baldwin. It is situated at the junction of the B&O Old Main Line (running to Baltimore) and the Metropolitan Branch (running to Washington, D.C.). The Met Branch also opened in 1873 and became the principal route for passenger trains between Baltimore, Washington and points west.

The main station building is a -story, triangular Gothic Revival with a four-story tower and a -story wing at the base. The tower has a pyramidal roof containing a dormer on each side. On top is a square cupola supporting a pyramidal peaked roof.

The station building itself is not open to the public and is used by CSX as storage and offices for maintenance of way crews. In 2008, new platforms and platform shelters were built for MARC commuters traveling east towards Washington DC, replacing older bus shelter–style structures which were erected in the mid-1990s.

During the blizzard of 2010, the south side awning on the main building collapsed under the weight of record snow fall, and was later removed, leaving half the building missing cover. In January 2011, work to rebuild the destroyed part of the structure began.

The Point of Rocks Railroad Station was listed on the National Register of Historic Places in 1973, and reopened for the Maryland Rail Commuter Service, now called MARC, which established the Brunswick Line.

The Duke Energy Holiday Trains display at the Cincinnati Museum Center features a station modeled on Point of Rocks.

In 2023, the station will be featured on a USPS Forever stamp in a 5-stamp "Railroad Stations" series. The stamp illustrations were made by Down the Street Designs, and Derry Noyes served as the art director.

Station layout
The station is not compliant with the Americans with Disabilities Act of 1990, lacking raised platforms for level boarding.

References

External links

Point of Rocks station official website
Point of Rocks station image (Dynamic Depot Maps)
, including photo from 2006, at Maryland Historical Trust

B & O Railroad Station at Point of Rocks - Ghosts of DC blog post on historic first train arrival

Brunswick Line
Former Baltimore and Ohio Railroad stations
MARC Train stations
Railway stations on the National Register of Historic Places in Maryland
Transportation buildings and structures in Frederick County, Maryland
Railway stations in the United States opened in 1873
Historic American Engineering Record in Maryland
National Register of Historic Places in Frederick County, Maryland